A picosecond (abbreviated as ps) is a unit of time in the International System of Units (SI) equal to 10−12 or  (one trillionth) of a second.  That is one trillionth, or one millionth of one millionth of a second, or 0.000 000 000 001 seconds. A picosecond is to one second as one second is to approximately 31,689 years. Multiple technical approaches achieve imaging within single-digit picoseconds: for example, the streak camera or intensified CCD (ICCD) cameras are able to picture the motion of light.

One picosecond is equal to 1000 femtoseconds, or 1/1000 nanoseconds.  Because the next SI unit is 1000 times larger, measurements of 10−11 and 10−10 second are typically expressed as tens or hundreds of picoseconds.  Some notable measurements in this range include:

 1.0 picoseconds (1.0 ps) – cycle time for electromagnetic frequency 1 terahertz (THz) (1 x 1012 hertz), an inverse unit. This corresponds to a wavelength of 0.3 mm, as can be calculated by multiplying 1 ps by the speed of light (approximately 3 x 108 m/s) to determine the distance traveled. 1 THz is in the far infrared.
 1 picosecond – time taken by light in vacuum to travel approximately 0.30 mm
 1 picosecond – half-life of a bottom quark
 ~1 picosecond – lifetime of a single  (hydronium) ion in water at 20 °C
 picoseconds to nanoseconds – phenomena observable by dielectric spectroscopy
 1.2 picoseconds – switching time of the world's fastest transistor (845 GHz, as of 2006)
 1.7 picoseconds - rotational correlation time of water
 3.3 picoseconds (approximately) – time taken for light to travel 1 millimeter
 10 picoseconds after the Big Bang – electromagnetism separates from the other fundamental forces
 34 picoseconds - signal rise time (20% to 80%) of a SFP+ transmitter for 10 Gigabit Ethernet.
 10–150 picoseconds – rotational correlation times of a molecule (184 g/mol) from hot to frozen water
 100 picoseconds - Unit Interval of a 10 Gbps serial communication link, such as USB 3.1.
 108.7827757 picoseconds – transition time between the two hyperfine levels of the ground state of the caesium-133 atom at absolute zero
 330 picoseconds (approximately) – the time it takes a common 3.0 GHz computer CPU to complete a processing cycle

See also
 SI unit
 Second
 Nanosecond
 Microsecond
 Millisecond
 Jiffy (time)
 Orders of magnitude (time)

References

External links
National Institute for Standards and Technology Glossary

Orders of magnitude (time)

fr:1 E-12 s